
Laguna Mirim or Gaiba Mirim is a lake in Germán Busch Province, Bolivia and Mato Grosso, Brazil, being on the southern end of Bolivia's border with Brazil. Its surface area is 15.8 km2.

The nearest major city is Bolivia's Santa Cruz de la Sierra.

Lakes of Brazil
Bolivia–Brazil border
International lakes of South America
Landforms of Mato Grosso
Lakes of Santa Cruz Department (Bolivia)